The year 1642 in science and technology involved some significant events.

Astronomy
 Rundetårn astronomical observatory for the University of Copenhagen is completed, as is also the Panzano Observatory.

Computing
 19-year-old Blaise Pascal begins to develop the Pascaline, the first practical mechanical calculator, initially to help with the recording of taxes.

Exploration
 November 24 – Abel Tasman, Dutch explorer, is the first European known to sight Tasmania, which he names Anthoonij van Diemenslandt.
 December 13 – Tasman is the first European known to sight New Zealand.

Technology
 Opening throughout of the Briare Canal in France, the first summit level canal in Europe built using pound locks.
 The printmaking process of mezzotint is developed by Ludwig von Siegen.

Births
 March (possible date) – Seki Takakazu, Japanese mathematician (died 1708)
 December 25 (OS) – Isaac Newton, English polymath (died 1727)

Deaths
 January 8 – Galileo Galilei, Italian astronomer (born 1564)

References

 
17th century in science
1640s in science